Pallakki is a 2007 Indian Kannada-language romantic drama film directed by K. Narendra Babu and written by Paramesh. The film stars Prem Kumar and newcomer Ramnitu Chaudhary. The film was produced by P2 Productions.

The film released on 4 May 2007 to generally negative reviews from critics. The film failed commercially at the box-office. The critics commented that the film had poor script and presentation was equally poor.

Cast
 Prem Kumar as Lakshmikanth
 Ramanithu Chaudhary as Prarthana
 Doddanna 
 Ramesh Bhat
 Sumithra
 Sharan
 Bullet Prakash
 Biradar
 Divya shridar

Soundtrack
The music of the film was composed by Gurukiran.

Awards

 Filmfare Award for Best Lyricist – Kannada - V. Manohar for "Kannallu Neenene"
 Udaya Award for Best Male Playback Singer - Gurukiran for "Kannallu Neenene"

References

External source

 Movie review
 Pallakki - Lacks in variety

2007 films
2000s Kannada-language films
Indian romantic drama films
Films scored by Gurukiran
2007 romantic drama films